The 2022 European Amateur Team Championship took place 5–9 July at Royal St George's Golf Club in Sandwich, Kent, England. It was the 39th men's golf European Amateur Team Championship.

Team Spain won the championship. Defending champion from the 2021 European Amateur Team Championship, team Denmark, finished third.

Venue 

Royal St George's Golf Club was founded in 1887 and has previously hosted the 1965 European Amateur Team Championship and The Open Championship 15 times, last time in 2021.

Course layout

Format 
Nations qualified were the teams placed 1st to 13th from the 2019 championship and the teams placed 1st, 2nd and 3rd from the 2019 and the 2021 European Amateur Team Championship Division 2.

Each nation team consists of six players. On the first two days each player played 18 holes of stroke play each day. The lowest five scores from each team's six players counted to the team total each day.

The eight best teams formed flight A, in knock-out match-play over the following three days. The teams were seeded based on their positions after the stroke play. The first placed team to play the quarter final against the eight placed team, the second against the seventh, the third against the sixth and the fourth against the fifth. Teams were allowed to use six players during the team matches, selecting four of them in the two morning foursome games and five players in to the afternoon single games. Teams knocked out after the quarter finals played one foursome game and four single games in each of their remaining matches. Extra holes were played in games that were all square after 18 holes. However, if the result of the team match was already decided, undecided games were declared halved.

The teams placed 9–16 in the stroke-play stage formed flight B, to also play knock-out match-play, but with one foursome game and four single games in each match, to decide their final positions. The teams placed 17–19 formed flight C, to meet each other with one foursome game and four single games in each match, to decide their final positions.

A second division, giving nation teams the opportunity to qualify for the 2023 championship, took place at Pravets Golf Club in Bulgaria 6–9 July 2022.

Teams 
19 nation teams contested the event. Each team consisted of six players.

Players in the participating teams

Winners 
Tied leaders of the opening 36-hole competition was team Spain and team France, each with a 7-under-par score of 693, two strokes ahead of team England. Spain was declared the winner, with the better total of the two non-counting scores.

There was no official award for the lowest individual score, but individual leader was Julien Sale, France, with a 6-under-par score of 134, two strokes ahead of nearest competitors.

Spain continued trough the match-play to win the gold medal, earning their fifth title and first since 2017, beating three-times-champion Sweden in the final 4–2.

Defending champion Denmark earned the bronze on third place, after beating host nation England 5–2 in the bronze match.

Results 
Qualification round

Team standings after first round

Team standings after final qualification round

* Note: In the event of a tie the order was determined by thebest total of the two non-counting scores of the two rounds.

Individual leaders

 Note: There was no official award for the lowest individual scores.

Flight A

Bracket

Final games

* Note: Game declared halved, since team match already decided.

Flight B

Bracket

Flight C

Team matches

Team standings

Final standings

See also
Eisenhower Trophy – biennial world amateur team golf championship for men organized by the International Golf Federation.
European Amateur Championship – European amateur individual golf championship for men organised by the European Golf Association.
European Ladies' Team Championship – European amateur team golf championship for women organised by the European Golf Association.

References

External links 
European Golf Association: Full results

European Amateur Team Championship
Golf tournaments in England
European Amateur Team Championship
European Amateur Team Championship
European Amateur Team Championship